The East Papuan languages is a defunct proposal for a family of Papuan languages spoken on the islands to the east of New Guinea, including New Britain, New Ireland, Bougainville, Solomon Islands, and the Santa Cruz Islands. There is no evidence that these languages are related to each other, and the Santa Cruz languages are no longer recognized as Papuan.

All but two of the starred languages below (Yélî Dnye and Sulka) make a gender distinction in their pronouns. Several of the heavily Papuanized Austronesian languages of New Britain do as well. This suggests a pre-Austronesian language area in the region.

History of the proposal

The East Papuan languages were proposed as a family by linguist Stephen Wurm (1975) and others. However, their work was preliminary, and there is little evidence that the East Papuan languages actually have a genetic relationship. For example, none of these fifteen languages marked with asterisks below share more than 2–3% of their basic vocabulary with any of the others. Dunn and colleagues (2005) tested the reliability of the proposed 2–3% cognates by randomizing the vocabulary lists and comparing them again. The nonsense comparisons produced the same 2–3% of "shared" vocabulary, demonstrating that the proposed cognates of the East Papuan languages, and even of proposed families within the East Papuan languages, are as likely to be due to chance as to any genealogical relationship. Thus in a conservative classification, many of the East Papuan languages would be considered language isolates.

Since the islands in question have been settled for at least 35 000 years, their considerable linguistic diversity is unsurprising. However, Malcolm Ross (2001; 2005) has presented evidence from comparing pronouns from nineteen of these languages that several of the lower-level branches of East Papuan may indeed be valid families. This is the classification adopted here. For Wurm's more inclusive classification, see the Ethnologue entry here.

Classification (Ross 2005)

Small families
Each of the first five entries in boldface is an independent language family, not known to be related to the others. Languages that are transparently related to each other are listed together on the same line. The first family is a more tentative proposal than the others and awaits confirmation.

Reconstructed pronoun sets for each of the families are given in the individual articles.

? Yele – West New Britain family [tentative]

East New Britain family

North Bougainville family (Bougainville)

South Bougainville family (Bougainville)

Central Solomon family

* Dunn and colleagues found no demonstrable shared vocabulary between these fifteen languages.

** Ross considered these four languages in addition to the fifteen studied by Dunn and colleagues.

True language isolates
These three languages are not thought to be demonstrably related to each other or to any language in the world.

Sulka isolate* – New Britain (poor data quality; the possibility remains that Sulka will be shown to be related to Kol or Baining)
Kol isolate* – New Britain
Kuot (Panaras) isolate* – New Ireland

* Dunn and colleagues found no demonstrable shared vocabulary between these fifteen languages.

Austronesian languages formerly classified as East Papuan
Wurm classified the three languages of the Santa Cruz and Reef Islands as an additional family within East Papuan. However, new data on these languages, along with advances in  the reconstruction of Proto-Oceanic, has made it clear that they are in fact Austronesian: 
 Reefs – Santa Cruz languages: Santa Cruz, Nanggu, Äiwoo

Similarly, Wurm had classified the extinct Kazukuru language and its possible sister languages of New Georgia as a sixth branch of East Papuan. However, in a joint 2007 paper, Dunn and Ross argued that this was also Austronesian.
 Kazukuru family: Kazukuru language

Lexical comparison
The tables below give lexical comparisons for the East Papuan languages (i.e., all Papuan languages spoken in New Britain and islands to the east), with languages listed roughly from west to east. All lexical items are from the Trans-New Guinea database unless noted otherwise.

See also
Papuan languages

References

 
 
 
 
 
 

 
Languages of Papua New Guinea
Languages of the Solomon Islands
Proposed language families
Papuan languages